is the first studio album from Hello! Project solo artist Maki Goto. It was released on February 5, 2003. The first-press version comes in a special package with a photobook.

Track listing

Oricon ranks and sales

External links 
 Makking Gold 1 entry on the Up-Front Works official website

2003 debut albums
Maki Goto albums